The Beholder is a role-playing game magazine that was edited and published in the UK.

Publication history
The Beholder was a monthly role-playing game magazine first published in 1979, edited by Mike Stoner. Articles were generally about AD&D including campaign development, variant types of combat, and new monsters, as well as some fiction and opinion pieces. Contributors included Mike Stoner (the editor), Don Turnbull, and Dave Davies.

Awards
The Beholder was awarded "Best Games Fanzine" at the Games Day convention in 1980.

Reviews
In the June 1981 edition of Dragon (Issue #50), David Nalle found that "The quality of thought in The Beholder is surprisingly even. Articles tend to be very average. There are few real losers, and likewise few examples of brilliance." Nalle found the weakest articles to be about monsters, but the 'zine was "strong in articles on campaign expansion, and in the small scenarios of a page or two in length which appear in each issue." Nalle concluded that The Beholder lacked the ability to grab the reader's attention, saying it "does not catch the eye and imagination and shout for instant incorporation in the reader’s next dungeon."

References

1979 establishments in the United Kingdom
Defunct magazines published in the United Kingdom
Magazines established in 1979
Magazines with year of disestablishment missing
Monthly magazines published in the United Kingdom
Role-playing game magazines